There are 85 Sites of Special Scientific Interest (SSSIs) within the Brecon Beacons National Park just under 10% of the over 1000 such designated areas in Wales as a whole. As elsewhere, the majority of sites of special scientific interest (also commonly referred to as 'SSSIs') in this National Park are designated for their flora and/or fauna (‘biological SSSIs’) whilst a lesser number are designated for their geology (‘geological SSSIs’). Others again are designated in respect of both interests and may be described as ‘mixed’. Natural Resources Wales is the body responsible for their designation and issuing consents for (or indeed refusing permission for) activities to take place within them. Most SSSIs are single contiguous areas though a handful  comprise two or more separate parcels of land (see 'sections' column in table below).

The National Park stretches across parts of seven separate principal areas (counties or county boroughs of Blaenau Gwent, Caerphilly, Carmarthenshire, Merthyr Tydfil, Monmouthshire, Powys and Rhondda Cynon Taf) and there are SSSIs within the National Park sectors of each of them except for Caerphilly. A few SSSIs straddle the boundaries between two or three of these principal areas. Some also straddle the boundary of the National Park and may extend into other council areas such as Neath Port Talbot.

Other websites
http://lle.gov.wales/catalogue/item/ProtectedSitesSitesOfSpecialScientificInterest/?lang=en

References

Brecon Beacons National Park
Brecon Beacons
Brecon